The Origins of American Social Science is a 1991 book by Dorothy Ross on the early history of social science in the United States.

Bibliography

External links 

 
 Full text from the Internet Archive
 "An historian's view of American social science", by the author

1991 non-fiction books
English-language books
Cambridge University Press books
History of social sciences
History of science and technology in the United States